Sympheromatoideae is a subfamily of flowering plants in the Lamiaceae.

Genera 
 Congea
 Sphenodesme
 Symphorema

References

External links 
 
 

Asterid subfamilies
Lamiaceae